London Buses route 109 is a Transport for London contracted bus route in London, England. Running between Croydon and Brixton, it is operated by Abellio London.

History

Route 109 commenced operating on 8 April 1951 as a circular Purley - West Croydon station - Streatham - Elephant & Castle - Victoria Embankment - Westminster - Kennington - Norbury - Croydon - Purley route operating in both directions. It replaced tram routes 16 and 18, operating from Brixton and Thornton Heath garages with AEC Regent III RTs.

From 16 October 1957 it ran between Purley High Street and Victoria Embankment. On 23 January 1966, the Sunday service was withdrawn with the exception of a few early morning journeys operated by Thornton Heath garage. On 31 October 1970, these journeys were converted to one-man operation (OMO) using single-deck AEC Swifts, with subsequent conversion to double-deck Daimler Fleetline operation from 23 March 1974.
 
On 3 February 2001, it was converted to low floor operation with Alexander ALX400 bodied DAF DB250s. Upon being re-tendered, Arriva London successfully retained with new contracts commencing on 1 February 2003 and 30 January 2010. On 31 March 2012, route 109 was transferred from Thornton Heath to Brixton garage.

Upon being re-tendered, route 109 was awarded to Abellio London's Beddington Cross garage from 31 January 2015.

Current route
Route 109 operates via these primary locations:
Croydon
West Croydon   
Croydon University Hospital
Thornton Heath Pond
Norbury 
Streatham 
Streatham Hill  
Brixton

References

Further reading

External links

Bus routes in London
Transport in the London Borough of Croydon
Transport in the London Borough of Lambeth